Calvin Leonard Mac-Intosch (born 9 August 1989) is a professional footballer who plays as a centre back for Eredivisie side SC Cambuur. Born in the Netherlands, he plays for the Suriname national team.

A former youth team player at Ajax, he turned professional at HFC Haarlem in 2009. Following Haarlem's bankruptcy in January 2010, he moved on to SC Telstar. He spent four full seasons at Telstar, and made 91 league and cup appearances, before he moved up to the Eredivisie to play for SC Cambuur in May 2014. He signed with English club Port Vale in July 2016. He returned to the Netherlands to play for Almere City in January 2017. He joined Norwegian side Notodden in 2018, before again returning to Netherlands to sign for Fortuna Sittard in February 2019. He rejoined former club Cambuur in May 2019 and helped them to win the Eerste Divisie title in the 2020–21 season.

Career

Haarlem
Mac-Intosch spent 12 years at the Academy at Ajax and carried the club logo on the pitch during the 1998 UEFA Champions League final at the Amsterdam Arena. However he struggled with injuries and never featured in a first-team game. He joined Haarlem in June 2009, having been released by Ajax. He made his first team debut for Haarlem against SC Veendam at Haarlem Stadion on 7 August 2009. He scored his first goal for the club 17 days later against AGOVV Apeldoorn. On 30 October, he was sent off against FC Eindhoven. On 13 December, he received the second red card of his career against FC Volendam at the Kras Stadion. He made a total of 22 Eerste Divisie (second tier) appearances for Haarlem before the club were made bankrupt and dissolved midway through the 2009–10 season. He quickly found a new club, ending the season with Telstar. He featured 13 times for Telstar, and received the third red card of his season in a 1–0 defeat to PEC Zwolle at the IJsseldelta Stadion on 12 February. Telstar ended the season in 18th place, finishing ahead of relegated FC Oss on goal difference.

Telstar
He played nine games in the 2009–10 season as Telstar rose to 14th place, and scored his first goal for the club in a 1–1 draw with Go Ahead Eagles on 29 April. However, he played just once in the 2011–12 campaign. He went on to secure a first team place in the 2012–13 season, and played 31 games as the "White Lions" posted a 14th-place finish in the league. He scored four goals in 37 appearances in the 2013–14 campaign, helping Telstar to a 15th-place finish.

Cambuur
He signed a one-year contract with Eredivisie (first tier) club Cambuur in May 2014. He made 23 appearances throughout the 2014–15 campaign as the "Yellow-Blues" posted a 12th-place finish, and he signed a new one-year contract in March 2015. He missed four months of the 2015–16 season with a knee injury picked up in early November, and underwent surgery to correct the problem. He played 15 games throughout the season, and scored twice; once in a 2–2 draw with De Graafschap and the other in a 6–2 defeat at PSV Eindhoven. Cambuur were relegated in last place, and Mac-Intosch was released at the end of the season.

Port Vale
In July 2016, Mac-Intosch signed a two-year contract with English League One club Port Vale. He started two of the club's opening three games of the 2016–17 season, but then went seven weeks without a game, and after being booked whilst the "Valiants" conceded two early goals he was substituted just 28 minutes into a 2–2 draw with Oxford United at Vale Park on 22 October. He started just three league games despite being named in the matchday squad 22 times as the form of Nathan Smith and Remie Streete left him with limited first team opportunities, and he left the club by mutual consent in January 2017 shortly after Michael Brown succeeded Bruno Ribeiro as manager.

Almere City
Mac-Intosch returned to the Eerste Divisie following his spell in England and signed a one-and-half year contract with Jack de Gier's Almere City in January 2017. He scored three goals in 13 games to help the "Sheepheads" qualify for the play-offs at the end of the 2016–17 season. However they exited the play-offs at the first round following a 6–2 aggregate defeat to Helmond Sport. City's aim for the 2017–18 season was to again reach the play-offs. They succeeded in their aim but manager still stated he was not satisfied with the defence and de Gier did not extend his contract at the club.

Notodden
He joined Norwegian 1. divisjon side Notodden midway through the 2018 season.

Fortuna Sittard
On 20 February 2019, Mac-Intosch signed a contract with Eredivisie club Fortuna Sittard to run until the end of the 2018–19 season, following a successful trial spell; he joined the club after a wave of injuries to central defenders which left Wessel Dammers, Anthony Syhre, Kai Heerings and Branislav Niňaj unavailable.

Return to Cambuur
On 24 May 2019, Mac-Intosch signed a two-year contract, with an option for a further year, at former club Cambuur. Technical manager Foeke Booy said that he was a "stable and reliable" player. At the time the 2019–20 season was halted due to the COVID-19 pandemic in the Netherlands, Cambuur were top of the Eerste Divisie and Mac-Intosch was credited with leading the defensive line as they also boasted the best defensive record in the division. The Royal Dutch Football Association (KNVB) ruled that Cambuur would not be promoted, despite the club sitting 11 points ahead of the play-off places. Manager Henk de Jong called the decision "the greatest disgrace ever in Dutch sport". Mac-Intosch made 37 appearances in the 2020–21 season, helping Cambuur to win promotion as Eerste Divisie title winners. The club celebrated with a helicopter ride, though Mac-Intosch declined to go on the trip, stating that "I think [it is] too much. But I saw some videos of the guys and they seemed to enjoy it, so I enjoy as well then. To be honest, I thought it would be military helicopter, but it [looks] somewhat old-fashioned. You know; I am fine in an airplane but a helicopter... hmm, not for me." He played 34 games in the 2021–22 campaign.

International career
Born in the Netherlands, Mac-Intosh is of Surinamese descent. He debuted with the Surinamese national team in a friendly 1–0 loss to Thailand on 27 March 2022.

Style of play
In December 2014, he was described as a "dark Jaap Stam" by FOX Sports analyst Jan van Halst. Mac-Intosch responded by saying "I wouldn't say that. I'm just Calvin Mac-Intosch", and stated that though he was a tough centre-back, he was not overly rough.

Career statistics

Honours
Cambuur
Eerste Divisie: 2020–21

References

External links
 

1989 births
Living people
Footballers from Amsterdam
Surinamese footballers
Suriname international footballers
Dutch footballers
Dutch sportspeople of Surinamese descent
Association football central defenders
HFC Haarlem players
SC Telstar players
SC Cambuur players
Dutch expatriate footballers
Surinamese expatriate footballers
Expatriate footballers in England
Dutch expatriate sportspeople in England
Surinamese expatriate sportspeople in England
Port Vale F.C. players
Almere City FC players
Expatriate footballers in Norway
Dutch expatriate sportspeople in Norway
Notodden FK players
Fortuna Sittard players
Eerste Divisie players
Eredivisie players
English Football League players
Norwegian First Division players